The Victorian Premier's Prize for Poetry, formerly known as the C. J. Dennis Prize for Poetry, is a prize category in the annual Victorian Premier's Literary Award. As of 2011 it has an enumeration of 25,000. The winner of this category prize vies with 4 other category winners for overall Victorian Prize for Literature valued at an additional 100,000.

The prize was formerly known as the C. J. Dennis Prize for Poetry from inception until 2010, when the awards were re-established under the stewardship of the Wheeler Centre and restarted with new prize amounts and a new name. It was named after the early twentieth century vernacular poet C. J. Dennis.

Victorian Premier's Prize for Poetry

C. J. Dennis Prize for Poetry (inactive) 
This award is no longer active. It was renamed in 2011 to Victorian Premier's Prize for Poetry (see above).

External links
 Official site

Notes

References

Victorian Premier's Literary Awards
Australian poetry awards
Awards established in 1985